Paige Hauschild (b. 17 August 1999) is an American water polo player. She is a member of the United States women's national water polo team, and participated in the 2020 Tokyo Summer Olympics, where she won a gold medal.

Career highlights 
 2017 World Championship (gold)
 2019 World Championship (gold)
 2020 Tokyo Summer Olympics (gold)

Personal life 
Hauschild was born in Santa Barbara, California to Jenni and Dwayne Hauschild. Her father played volleyball at Long Beach State University. She grew up in Santa Barbara and attended San Marcos High School, graduating in 2017. Hauschild attends the University of Southern California, where she studies communication.

References 

American female water polo players
1999 births
Living people
People from Santa Barbara, California
Olympic gold medalists for the United States in water polo
Water polo players at the 2020 Summer Olympics
Medalists at the 2020 Summer Olympics